The following is a list of mayors of the city of Kharkiv, Ukraine. It includes positions equivalent to mayor, such as chairperson of the Kharkiv City Council's executive committee.

Mayors

Before 1918

As part of the independent Ukrainian state, 1918

Under the control of the White Movement, 1919

Soviet period

Independent Ukraine, after 1991

Latest election 

|- style="background-color:#E9E9E9;text-align:center;"
! style="text-align:left;" colspan="2"| Candidate
! style="text-align:left;" colspan="2"| Party
! width="75"|Votes
! width="30"|%
|-
| style="background-color:;"|
| style="text-align:left;"| Ihor Terekhov
| style="text-align:left;" colspan="2"| Kernes Bloc — Successful Kharkiv
| 
| 50,66
|-
| style="background-color:;"|
| style="text-align:left;" colspan="2"| Mykhailo Dobkin
| style="text-align:left;"| Independent
| 
| 28,41
|-
| style="background-color:;"|
| style="text-align:left;" colspan="2"| Oleksandr Skoryk
| style="text-align:left;"| European Solidarity
| 
| 5,36
|-
| style="background-color:;"|
| style="text-align:left;" colspan="2"| Konstantin Nemychev
| style="text-align:left;"| Independent
| 
| 4,25
|-
| style="background-color:#E9E9E9;" colspan="6"|
|- style="font-weight:bold"
| style="text-align:left;" colspan="4"| Total
| 
|100,00
|-
|}

See also

 Timeline of Kharkiv

References

 This article incorporates information from the Ukrainian Wikipedia.

External links

History of Kharkiv
Kharkiv